The Mannargudi is a large coal field located in the south of India in Tamil Nadu. Mannargudi represents one of the largest coal reserves in India, having estimated reserves of 2,037 crore tonnes of coal.

References 

Coalfields of India
Energy in Tamil Nadu
Mining in Tamil Nadu